Etterlene Louise Rodriguez (previously DeBarge, née Abney; born October 13, 1935) is an American gospel singer, songwriter, and matriarch of the American R&B/Soul vocal group DeBarge. She is also the author of Other Side of the Pain, which talked about her struggles in her marriage to her children's father and also documented her children's rise to fame as well as their struggles under the glare of the spotlight.

Biography

Early years
Born Etterlene Abney on October 13, 1935 in Royal Oak, Michigan, she was one of twelve children and has a twin sister. When she was a child, her family moved to the Brewster-Douglass housing projects, located in the east side of Detroit. In 1952, she met an Army veteran named Robert DeBarge, a man of French and English descent from Cicero, Illinois.  The couple married in 1953 settling in a predominantly black section of Detroit, where they had ten children. In 1972, the DeBarges moved to Grand Rapids, Michigan, where Etterlene's brother, Bishop William Charles Abney, Jr., pastored Bethel Pentecostal Church.  Etterlene divorced Robert DeBarge sometime in 1974. She later married a second time, to George Rodriguez, a Puerto Rican, leading to the erroneous rumor that the DeBarge family was half-Hispanic. However, contrary to popular belief, they are not of Latino descent.

Children and grandchildren

Robert and Etterlene DeBarge had ten children during their 21-year marriage:
Etterlene "Bunny" DeBarge (born March 10, 1955)
Robert "Bobby" DeBarge, Jr. (March 5, 1956 – August 16, 1995)
Thomas "Tommy" DeBarge (September 6, 1957 – October 21, 2021)
William "Randy" DeBarge (born August 6, 1958)
Mark "Marty" DeBarge (born June 19, 1959)
Eldra "El" DeBarge (born June 4, 1961)
James DeBarge (born August 22, 1963)
Jonathan Arthur "Chico" DeBarge (born June 23, 1966)
Carol "Peaches" DeBarge (born June 5, 1970)
Darrell "Young" DeBarge (born June 5, 1970)

Etterlene has dozens of grandchildren, several of whom are involved in the entertainment industry. They include Kristinia DeBarge, daughter of James, a singer who appeared on 2003's American Juniors followed up with a charting album (Exposed) and single ("Goodbye").

Music career
In 1991, with the help of her famous children, Etterlene, a religious woman, released a gospel album, Back on Track, under the DeBarge Family moniker. In 2005, she released a second gospel album, A City Called Heaven. She is affectionately known to her grandchildren as "Mama D". She currently enjoys her grandchildren and lives in California.

References

1935 births
Living people
Identical twins
21st-century American singers
20th-century American women singers
20th-century American singers
African-American women singers
People from Royal Oak, Michigan
Musicians from Grand Rapids, Michigan
Singers from Detroit
American gospel singers
American Christians
American autobiographers
DeBarge family
American twins
Women autobiographers
American women non-fiction writers
21st-century American women